Dr. Prakash Chandra Lohani (born 21 April 1944) is a Nepalese politician, economist and member of the ARPPR.

He has served as a Minister of Finance, Minister of Foreign Affairs, Minister of Agriculture, Minister of Labour & Transportation, and Minister of Housing & Physical Planning in governments formed during the panchayat era and in governments formed after the restoration of multi-party democracy.

Career
Lohani was appointed Minister of Finance of Nepal in July 1983 and June 2003. During his tenure as the Finance Minister, for the first time in Nepal, he initiated the process of financial liberalization by introducing policies in favor of privatization of public enterprises. Growth in Nepal's financial market, especially the emergence of banking sectors, financial institutions can be attributed to the policies enacted by him during his tenure as a finance minister. Nepal's first joint venture backed bank, Nepal Arab Bank Limited (now Nabil Bank), was established during his tenure.

Lohani along with his love toward politics, has a keen interest in finance and economics. He has shared his ideas and views at various national and international forums such Woodrow Wilson International Center for Scholars in Washington, DC,  (chairman) 41st session of the ESCAP in Bangkok and (chairman) Nepal Aid Group meeting in 2004. Dr. Lohani has also published papers in prestigious journals like the University of Chicago Journal of Political Economy.

He was a Fulbright scholar who taught as an assistant professor of finance at the California State University, Northridge, California, US (1968–1969). Dr. Lohani has an MBA degree from Indiana University and PhD from University of California Los Angeles (UCLA).

Lohani was a member of Nepal's historic erstwhile Constituent Assembly, which had been tasked with drafting a new constitution. At present Lohani is the chairman of the Rastriya Prajatantra Party.

References

Sources

 

1944 births
Living people
Indiana University alumni
Nepalese economists
University of California, Los Angeles alumni
Finance ministers of Nepal
Government ministers of Nepal
Rastriya Janashakti Party politicians
Rastriya Prajatantra Party politicians
Foreign Ministers of Nepal
Members of the Rastriya Panchayat
Nepal MPs 1991–1994
Nepal MPs 1994–1999

Members of the 1st Nepalese Constituent Assembly